Ramachandrapuram Mandal is one of the 22 mandals in Konaseema district of Andhra Pradesh. As per census 2011, there are 1 town 20 villages.

Demographics 
Ramachandrapuram Mandal has total population of 114,527 as per the Census 2011 out of which 57,410 are males while 57,117 are females and the average Sex Ratio of Ramachandrapuram Mandal is 995. The total literacy rate of Ramachandrapuram Mandal is 77.33%. The male literacy rate is 72.47% and the female literacy rate is 67.08%.

Towns and villages

Towns 

Ramachandrapuram, Konaseema, [Konaseema district]] (Municipality)

Villages 

Ambikapalle Agraharam
Bheemakrosupalem
Chodavaram
Draksharama
Hasanbada
Jagannaikulapalem
Kandulapalem
Kapavaram
Narasapurapupeta
Oduru
Tadipalle
Thotapeta
Unduru
Utrumilli
Vegayammapeta
Velampalem
Vella
Venkatayapalem
Yanamadala
Yerupalle

See also 
List of mandals in Andhra Pradesh

References 

Mandals in Konaseema district
Mandals in Andhra Pradesh